The Court of Session is the supreme civil court of Scotland

Court of Session may also refer to:
 Court of Sessions (California)
 Sessions Court, India and Malaysia
 Court of Session (Pakistan), the main Criminal Court of Pakistan